The fourth season of 7th Heaven—an American family-drama television series, created and produced by Brenda Hampton—premiered on September 20, 1999, on The WB, and concluded on May 22, 2000 (22 episodes).

Cast and characters

Main 

Stephen Collins as Eric Camden
Catherine Hicks as Annie Camden
Barry Watson as Matt Camden
David Gallagher as Simon Camden
Jessica Biel as Mary Camden
Beverley Mitchell as Lucy Camden
Mackenzie Rosman as Ruthie Camden
Chaz Lamar Shepherd as John Hamilton
Maureen Flannigan as Shana Sullivan
Happy as Happy the Dog

Recurring
Adam LaVorgna as Robbie Palmer (6 episodes)

Episodes

References

1999 American television seasons
2000 American television seasons
Television about the internment of Japanese Americans